was a United States Coast Guard Cutter commissioned in 1919.
 
Vidette was built as the wooden-hulled civilian yacht Howarda in 1913 by the Essington Company in Essington, Pennsylvania. The U.S. Navy acquired Howarda in 1917 for use as a patrol boat during World War I. She served in the Navy as USS Howarda (SP-144) until 1919.

The Navy transferred Howarda to the United States Department of the Treasury for use by the United States Coast Guard on 3 May 1919 or 1 July 1919. On 1 January 1929 she was transferred to Miami, Florida.

Videttes further career and fate are unclear. The United States Coast Guard Historians Office states that she was sold on 28 July 1922, but clearly she remained in Coast Guard service through at least 1929. She probably was sold sometime in the 1930s.

Notes

References
United States Coast Guard Historian's Office: U.S. Coast Guard Cutter History: Vidette (1919)

NavSource Online: Section Patrol Craft Photo Archive: USCGC Vidette ex-USS Howarda (SP 144)

Ships of the United States Coast Guard
Ships built in Essington, Pennsylvania
Individual yachts
1913 ships